Randall Bertram Griepp  (March 11, 1940 – September 8, 2022) was an American cardiothoracic surgeon who collaborated with Norman Shumway in the development of the first successful heart transplant procedures in the U.S. He had an international reputation for contributions to the surgical treatment of aortic aneurysms and aortic dissection and in heart and lung transplantations. He received nearly $8 million in grants from the National Heart, Lung, and Blood Institute.

He was a Professor of Cardiothoracic Surgery at the Icahn School of Medicine at Mount Sinai in New York City.

Life and career

Randall Griepp graduated from Oakland Technical High School and received a BS from California Institute of Technology. He earned his medical degree from Stanford University Medical School, then completed residencies at both Stanford Hospital and Bellevue Hospital Center. He also did a fellowship in cardiothoracic surgery at Stanford Hospital.

In 1985, Griepp succeeded Robert S. Litwak as Chief of the Division of Cardiothoracic Surgery at Mount Sinai Hospital. Under Griepp's direction, Cardiothoracic Surgery was made an independent department at both the Icahn School of Medicine at Mount Sinai and Mount Sinai Hospital, and Griepp was its first chairman. A heart and lung transplant program commenced in 1990.

Griepp stepped down as chairman in 2001 to pursue research and clinical interests, and was succeeded by David H. Adams.

Griepp died on September 8, 2022, aged 82.

Awards
Children's Heart Fund Precious Heart Award, 2003
 Distinguished Scientist Award, Bicuspid Aortic Foundation

Publications
Partial list:

Etz CD, Plestis KA, Kari FA, Luehr M, Bodian CA, Spielvogel D, Griepp RB. Staged repair of thoracic and thoracoabdominal aortic aneurysms using the elephant trunk technique: a consecutive series of 215 first stage and 120 complete repairs. European Journal of Cardiothoracic Surgery 2008 Jun 12;. 
Etz CD, Homann TM, Silovitz D, Spielvogel D, Bodian CA, Luehr M, Di Luozzo G, Plestis KA, Griepp RB. Long-term survival after the Bentall procedure in 206 patients with bicuspid aortic valve. Annals of Thoracic Surgery. 2007 October; 84(4): 1189-1193. 
Etz CD, Homann TM, Rane N, Bodian CA, Di Luozzo G, Plestis KA, Spielvogel D, Griepp RB. Aortic root reconstruction with a bioprosthetic valved conduit: a consecutive series of 275 procedures. Journal of Thoracic and Cardiovascular Surgery. 2007 June; 133(6): 1455-1463. 
Spielvogel D, Etz CD, Silovitz D, Lansman SL, Griepp RB. Aortic arch replacement with a trifurcated graft. Annals of Thoracic Surgery. 2007 Feb; 83(2): 3791-3795. 
Etz CD, Halstead JC, Spielvogel D, Shahani R, Lazala R, Homann TM, Weisz DJ, Plestis K, Griepp RB. Thoracic and thoracoabdominal aneurysm repair: is reimplantation of spinal cord arteries a waste of time? Annals of Thoracic Surgery. 2006 November; 82(5): 1670-1677. 
Carroccio A, Spielvogel D, Ellozy SH, Lookstein RA, Chin IY, Minor ME, Sheahan CM, Teodorescu VJ, Griepp RB, Marin ML. Aortic arch and descending thoracic aortic aneurysms: experience with stent grafting for second-stage. Vascular. 2005 January–February; 13(1): 5-10. 
Hagl C, Strauch JT, Spielvogel D, Galla JD, Lansman SL, Squitieri R, Bodian CA, Griepp RB. Is the Bentall procedure for ascending aorta or aortic valve replacement the best approach for long-term event-free survival? Annals of Thoracic Surgery. 2003 September; 76(3): 698-702. 
Griepp RB, Ergin MA, Galla JD, Lansman S, Khan N, Quintana C, McCollough J, Bodian C. Looking for the artery of Adamkiewicz: a quest to minimize paraplegia after operations for aneurysms of the descending thoracic and thoracoabdominal aorta. Journal of Thoracic Cardiovascular Surgery. 1996 November; 112(5): 1202-1213. 
Griepp RB, Stinson EB, Bieber CP, Reitz BA, Copeland JG, Oyer PE, Shumway NE. Human heart transplantation: current status. Annals of Thoracic Surgery. 1976 August; 22(2): 171-175. 
Griepp RB, Stinson EB, Hollingsworth JF, Buehler D. Prosthetic replacement of the aortic arch. Journal of Thoracic Cardiovascular Surgery. 1975 December; 70(6): 1051-1063.

References

External links
Mount Sinai Hospital homepage
Icahn School of Medicine at Mount Sinai homepage
The Society of Thoracic Surgeons Surgical Video Library

1940 births
2022 deaths
American medical academics
American medical researchers
American surgeons
Stanford University School of Medicine alumni
Icahn School of Medicine at Mount Sinai faculty
People from Marshall, Minnesota